The Peak Hotel was a hotel at upper terminus of the Peak Tram in Hong Kong.  It started as a bar and restaurant, and a hotel with twenty bedrooms for summer visitors opening about the same time as the Peak Tram, in 1888.

About 13 years earlier, in 1875, N.J. Ede had built a house named Dunheved on the property. In 1881, Alexander Findlay Smith, a Scottish former railway man, had petitioned for the right to introduce a funicular railway to Hong Kong.  The Peak Tram was built and began operations in 1888.  About the same time, Findlay Smith bought Dunheved from Ede, and opened it as the Peak Hotel.  (Ede and his family moved next door.) After the Peak Tram opened, Findlay Smith quickly put the Peak Hotel on the market.
It was sold, and completely rebuilt into an imposing three-story building, reopening in 1890. It boasted of commodious and well-appointed accommodation, and the hotel was deservedly popular.  Later, another story was added to make it four stories, and then a two-story annexe with views down to Pok Fu Lam was built.  A further addition doubled the size of the annexe and added a third story.  The hotel commanded views of the city and the harbour in one direction, and of Pok Fu Lam facing Lamma Island in the other.

In 1922 it was bought by the owners of the rival Hong Kong Hotel for HK$ 600,000. The hotel's poor construction led to further deterioration. It closed in 1936 and in 1938 its fate was finally sealed by a fire.

References

Houses completed in 1875
Victoria Peak
Defunct hotels in Hong Kong
1888 establishments in Hong Kong
1936 disestablishments in Hong Kong
1938 fires in Asia
Hotels established in 1888
Hotels disestablished in 1936
Demolished buildings and structures in Hong Kong
Buildings and structures demolished in 1938